Saude George (30 November 1931 – 27 May 2010) was a Kenyan field hockey player. He competed at the 1960 Summer Olympics and the 1964 Summer Olympics.

References

External links
 

1931 births
2010 deaths
Kenyan male field hockey players
Olympic field hockey players of Kenya
Field hockey players at the 1960 Summer Olympics
Field hockey players at the 1964 Summer Olympics
Sportspeople from Nairobi
Kenyan people of Indian descent
Kenyan people of Goan descent
20th-century Kenyan people